Mansuri (also Romanized as Manşūrī) is a city in Salami Rural District, Khanafereh District, Shadegan County, Khuzestan Province, Iran. At the 2018 census, its population was 500,001 in 98,056 families.

References 

Populated places in Shadegan County